Polish Theatre may refer to:

Polish Theatre in Bydgoszcz
Polish Theatre in Poznań
Polish Theatre in Warsaw
Theatre of Poland